Neådalssnota is a mountain in the center of the Trollheimen mountain range. It lies in the municipality of Surnadal in Møre og Romsdal county, Norway. The mountain Snota lies just to the north, just next to the lake Gråsjøen.

Neådalssnota, due to its large southeastern flank, is easily seen among the Trollheimen mountains.

References

Mountains of Møre og Romsdal
Surnadal